List of British Sikhs is a list of notable Sikhs from the United Kingdom.

Academia and education

Harjinder Singh Dilgeer – National Professor of Sikh History. Director of SGPC Sikh History Research Board and author of 60 books on  Sikhism, presently Director of Guru Nanak Research Institute, Birmingham & thesikhs.org website.
Harminder Dua – Discovered a previously unknown layer lurking in the human eye named the "dua's layer".
Jagbir Jhutti Johal - Professor of religion, author and media commentator
Jagjit Chadha – Professor and Chair in Money and Banking in the Department of Economics at the University of Kent
Kalwant Bhopal – Professor of Education and Social Justice and Deputy Director of the Centre for Research in Race & Education at the University of Birmingham
Opinderjit Takhar - Researcher within Sikh Studies and Director of the Centre for Sikh and Panjabi Studies at the University of Wolverhampton.
Simon Singh – Mathematician and author
Sukhpal Singh Gill – Indian born UK academic and Assistant Professor of Computer Science at the Queen Mary University of London, UK.
Sukhbir Singh Kapoor – Vice Chancellor of The International School of Sikh Studies and Khalsa College London
Tejinder Virdee – Experimental particle physicist and Professor of Physics at Imperial College London
Yadvinder Malhi – Professor of Ecosystem Science at the University of Oxford and a Jackson Senior Research Fellow at Oriel College, Oxford.

Business and the professions

Tony Lit – Managing Director of Sunrise Radio
Dabinderjit Singh – Director at the National Audit Office
Harpal Kumar – Chief executive of Cancer Research UK
Jasminder Singh – Chairman of the Radisson Edwardian hotel empire.
Jaz Rai – Aerospace engineer and chairman of the Sikh Recovery Network
Kamel Hothi – Former banker at Lloyds Bank
Karamjit Singh – Chair of the University Hospitals of Leicester NHS Trust
Kulveer Ranger – Management Consultant. Former London Transport Minister and Mayor's Director of Environment and Digital London
Manjeet Singh Riyat – Emergency Care Consultant at University Hospitals of Derby and Burton NHS Foundation Trust
Param Singh – Technology and business professional
Rami Ranger – Founder of Sun Mark, an international marketing and distribution company
Ranjit Singh Boparan – Founder and owner of 2 Sisters Food Group
Reena Ranger – Director at Sun Mark and founder of Women Empowered Network
Reuben Singh – CEO of contact centre company alldayPA
Simon Arora – Billionaire businessman, CEO of the retail chain B & M.
Surinder Arora – Hotelier
Tom Singh – Founder of the high street fashion chain New Look.

Charity, community and non-profit

Amandeep Madra – Founder and chairman of the UK Punjab Heritage Association
Balwant Kaur – Founder and chairperson of Mata Nanki Foundation
Daljit Singh Shergill – President of Guru Nanak Gurdwara Smethwick
Imandeep Kaur – Director of Impact Hub: Birmingham
Jagraj Singh - Founder of Basics of Sikhi
Mohinder Singh Ahluwalia – Chairman of the Nishkam Group
Nidar Singh Nihang – Scholar and Grandmaster of Shastar Vidya
Ravi Singh – CEO Khalsa Aid

Film, drama and entertainment

Alexandra Aitken (Uttrang Kaur Khalsa) – Environmental campaigner, model, actress, artist and socialite
Ameet Chana – Actor
Amrit Maghera – Professional model turned actress
Chandeep Uppal – Critically acclaimed starring role as Meena Kumar in the film Anita and Me.
Gurinder Chadha – Film director
Harnaam Kaur – Model, anti-bullying activist, body positive activist
Kulvinder Ghir – Actor, comedian and writer
Jassa Ahluwalia – Actor and presenter
Lena Kaur – Best known for her role as Leila Roy in Channel 4's Hollyoaks 
Mandip Gill – Actress
Mandy Takhar – Actress
Neelam Gill – Model, known for her work with Burberry, Abercrombie & Fitch and appearing in Vogue.
Paul Chowdhry – Comedian and actor
Parminder Nagra – Actress born in Leicester
Perry Bhandal – Film director, screenwriter
Simon Rivers – English actor who played the role of Kevin Tyler in Doctors
Stephen Uppal – Known for playing Ravi Roy in the long-running British soap Hollyoaks

Law and justice

Alamjeet Kaur Chauhan – Lawyer and Femina Miss India winner 1978
Anup Singh Choudry – Retired High Court Judge
Bobbie Cheema-Grubb – Judge of the Queen's Bench Division of the High Court of Justice of England and Wales.
Jasvir Singh – Family Law Barrister
Jo Sidhu – Criminal Law Barrister
Mota Singh – Retired Circuit judge England
Lord Justice Singh - Rabinder Singh –  First Sikh Judge of the UK High court  Court of Appeal judge, formerly a High Court judge of the Queen's Bench Division

Journalism, writers and media

Aatish Taseer – Writer-journalist, and the son of Indian journalist Tavleen Singh
Anita Rani – Radio and television presenter
Bali Rai – English author of children's and young adult fiction
Bobby Friction – DJ, television presenter and radio presenter
Daljit Nagra – Poet
Gurpreet Kaur Bhatti – Writer
Hardeep Singh Kohli – Radio and television presenter
Max Arthur Macauliffe (1841–1913) – Senior administrator of the British Raj who was posted in the Punjab; prolific scholar and author.
Nirpal Singh Dhaliwal – Journalist and writer
Peter Bance – Historian, author and Maharaja Duleep Singh archivist
Priya Kaur-Jones – Newsreader
Raman Mundair – Poet, writer, artist and playwright
Ranvir Singh – English television presenter and journalist
Sathnam Sanghera – British journalist and author
Sonia Deol – English radio and television presenter
Sunny Hundal – Journalist, blogger and academic
Sunny and Shay – Husband and wife radio presenters
The Singh Twins – artists Amrit and Rabindra Kaur Singh

Music 

Aman Hayer – Bhangra producer and singer
Bally Sagoo – Record producer
Channi Singh – British-Indian bhangra musician, known as the "godfather" of bhangra in the West.
Diamond Duggal – Music producer, DJ, songwriter and guitarist
Dr Zeus – Punjabi singer and music producer
Gurdeep Samra – Music producer and DJ
Hard Kaur – Rapper and hip hop singer
Indy Sagu – Bhangra and hip hop musician
Jas Mann – Songwriter, musician, singer, record producer and film producer
Jassi Sidhu – Bhangra singer and the former lead singer of British Indian bhangra band B21
Jay Sean – R&B Artist
Juggy D – Bhangra, Punjabi, R&B
Malkit Singh – Punjabi bhangra singer
Manj Musik – Music composer, singer
Manni Sandhu – Music director
Panjabi MC – Rapper, musician and DJ
Rishi Rich – Music producer
Sardara Gill – Punjabi Bhangra singer, lead singer of Apna Sangeet
Steel Banglez – Record producer 
Silinder Pardesi – Bhangra singer-songwriter, lyricist, and composer
Surinder Singh Matharu – Founder of the Raj Academy Conservatoire
Sukshinder Shinda – Bhangra Record producer and singer–songwriter
Surjit Khan – Record producer, musician and singer-songwriter
Tarsame Singh Saini – Singer, composer and actor
Talvin Singh – Producer, composer and tabla player
Tigerstyle – Folkhop group
Tjinder Singh – Lead singer of British indie rock band Cornershop
Tru Skool - Music artist
Vic Briggs – Former blues and rock musician

Politics

Atma Singh – Policy Advisor to the Mayor of London on Asian Affairs in the Greater London Authority, under Mayor of London Ken Livingstone
Gurinder Josan – Labour party activist
Hardyal Dhindsa – Councillor
Indarjit Singh – Member House of Lords
Jas Athwal – Leader of Redbridge London Borough Council, Labour Party Politician
Marsha Singh – British Labour Party politician, and the Member of Parliament (MP) for Bradford West from 1997 to 2012
Neena Gill – Member of the European Parliament for the West Midlands
Onkar Sahota – Member of the London Assembly for Ealing and Hillingdon
Pam Gosal – Member of the Scottish Parliament for West Scotland
Parmjit Dhanda – British Labour Party politician who was the Member of Parliament (MP) for Gloucester from 2001 until the 2010 general election
Parmjit Singh Gill – Member of Parliament for Leicester South from July 2004 to May 2005, he was the first ethnic-minority Liberal Democrat MP
Paul Uppal – Former Conservative Member of Parliament and Small business commissioner
Piara Khabra – Labour Member of Parliament (MP) for Ealing Southall from 1992 until his death
Preet Gill – Member of Parliament (MP) for Birmingham Edgbaston since the 2017 general election. She is the first female British Sikh MP.
Ranbir Singh Suri, Baron Suri – Member House of Lords
Sonika Nirwal – Senior Ealing Southall constituency Labour politician representing the Greenford Broadway ward
Tanmanjeet Singh Dhesi – British Labour Party politician. Member of Parliament (MP) for Slough since 2017

Royalty and revolutionaries

Maharaja Duleep Singh – Last Maharaja of the Sikh Kingdom, exiled in 1849 during the British Raj and possibly the first permanent Sikh resident in England
Frederick Duleep Singh – Younger son of Duleep Singh, the last Maharaja of the Sikh Empire.
Princess Sophia Alexandra Duleep Singh – Prominent suffragette and accredited nurse

Sports

Akaash Bhatia – British boxer
Aman Dosanj – First British Asian footballer to represent England
Arjan Raikhy - Footballer for Aston Villa
Danny Batth – Footballer and Captain of Wolverhampton Wanderers F.C.
Fauja Singh – British Sikh centenarian marathon runner
Harpal Singh – Footballer
Kash Gill – Former kickboxing world champion
Michael Chopra – Footballer
Monty Panesar – England cricketer
Raj Hundal – Snooker player
Ravi Bopara – England cricketer
Skipping Sikh – Septuagenarian health and fitness personality

Causes célèbres 

Jagtar Singh Johal
Lakhvir Kaur Singh
Inderjit Kaur Bansal

See also

List of Canadian Sikhs
List of Sikhs
Sikhism in England
Sikhism in the United Kingdom

References

Sikhs
British